This is a list of cities and towns in Gauteng Province, South Africa. Most towns are no longer separate municipalities, their local governments having been merged into larger structures.

In the case of settlements that have had their official names changed the traditional name is listed first followed by the new name.

City of Johannesburg Metropolitan Municipality
 Alexandra
 Diepsloot
 Ennerdale
 Johannesburg
 Lenz (Lenasia)
 Midrand
 Modderfontein
 Orange Farm
 Randburg
Roodepoort
 Sandton
 Soweto
 Naturena

City of Ekurhuleni Metropolitan Municipality
 Alberton
 Bedfordview
 Benoni
 Boksburg
 Brakpan
 Bapsfontein
 Clayville
 Daveyton
 Duduza
 Edenvale
 Holfontein (Etwatwa)
 Germiston
 Isando
 Katlehong
 Kempton Park
 KwaThema
 Dunnottar
 Nigel
 Reiger Park
 Springs
 Tembisa (Thembisa)
 Tokoza (Thokoza)
 Tsakane
 Vosloorus
 Wattville

City of Tshwane Metropolitan Municipality
 Atteridgeville
 Bronberg
 Bronkhorstspruit
 Centurion (Verwoerdburg until 1994)
 Cullinan
 Ekangala
 Ga-Rankuwa
 Hammanskraal
 Irene
 Mabopane
 Mamelodi
 Pretoria
 Rayton
 Refilwe
 Soshanguve
 Winterveld
 Zithobeni

Sedibeng District Municipality

Emfuleni Local Municipality
 Boipatong
 Bophelong
 Evaton
 Sebokeng
 Sharpeville
 Vanderbijlpark
 Vereeniging

Midvaal Local Municipality
 Meyerton
 Randvaal
 Walkerville

Lesedi Local Municipality
 Devon
 Heidelberg
 Impumelelo
 Ratanda

West Rand District Municipality

Merafong City Local Municipality
 Carletonville
 Khutsong
 Fochville
 Kokosi
 Greenspark
 Wedela
 Welverdiend
 Blybank

Mogale City Local Municipality
 Hekpoort
 Kagiso
 Kromdraai
 Krugersdorp
 Magaliesburg
 Muldersdrift
 Munsieville
 Rietvallei
 Silverfields
 Tarlton

Randfontein Local Municipality
Bhongweni
Brandvlei
Mohlakeng
Panvlak Gold Mine
Randfontein
Toekomsrus
Zenzele

Westonaria Local Municipality
 Bekkersdal
 Westonaria

Sortable Table

External links
 List of Gauteng municipalities — Department of Health https://web.archive.org/web/20110526005142/http://www.doh.gov.za/department/foodcontrol/sa_municipal/gau-municipal.html
 Map showing municipalities https://web.archive.org/web/20060113100425/http://www.joburg.org.za/unicity/municipalities.stm

 
Gauteng